Yevgeniy Prokopov is a Ukrainian sculptor who was awarded the title of Merited Artist of Ukraine.

Biography
Yevgeniy was born in Kiev, in the Ukrainian SSR of the Soviet Union (in present-day Ukraine). His father, Yosyp Fedorovych Prokopov, a celebrated painter and World War II veteran, firmly believed in giving his son the freedom in pursuing his artistic talents. His mother, Valentina Semenivna, a geologist, frequently took her son on geological expeditions, which later served as an inspiration to his future sculptures.

A graduate of the Kiev Arts Institute, he was a student of Vasyl Borodai.

Notable outdoor sculptures
 Monument to “Heaven’s Brigade” and all those who gave their lives for a free and sovereign Ukraine. Saint Andrew Ukrainian Orthodox Cathedral, Bloomingdale, IL USA
Monument of Patriarch Josyf Cardinal Slipyj. Sts Volodymyr & Olha Cathedral, Chicago, IL
 Bronze group of Two Cyclists. Lite-on Corporation, Neihu, Taiwan.
 Sculptural composition of Prometheus. State Museum of Taras Shevchenko, Kyiv, Ukraine.
 Sculptural composition of Memory. Mikhaylivskiy Cathedral, Kyiv, Ukraine.
 Memorial statue of Mykola Lukash. Kyiv, Ukraine.
 Memorial Statue of Oles Gonchar. Kyiv, Ukraine.
 Sculptural composition of Pietà. Ternopil, Ukraine.
 Sculptural composition of Unity of Faith. Evangelist-Lutheran Church, Reinhardsdorf, Germany.
 Sculptural composition of Recarnation. St Nicholas Church, Kyiv, Ukraine.
 Sculptural composition of Pokrova. Podil district, Kyiv, Ukraine.
 Statue Ukraine-Motherland. Rivne, Ukraine.
 Statue of Students of Professors of the Kyiv State University. Kyiv, Ukraine.

Gallery

International prizes and grants
1997 - Prize from Edouard-Marcel Sandoz, Taylor Foundation, Paris, France.

References

External links
http://prokopov.org/

https://sculpture.org/member/Prokopov
Shoebox Sculpture - Yevgeniy Prokopov

1950 births
Living people
Ukrainian sculptors
National Academy of Visual Arts and Architecture alumni
Ukrainian male sculptors